WLVJ (1020 kHz) is a commercial AM radio station licensed to Boynton Beach, Florida, and serving the West Palm Beach radio market.  The station airs a Haitian Creole radio format. WLVJ is owned by Actualidad Media Group.

The weekday schedule is made up of all news blocks along with talk programs in the daytime and sports shows in the evening.  Some hours, the station carries the audio from CNN en Español.

WLVJ is powered at 4,700 watts by day.  Because AM 1020 is a clear channel frequency, reserved for Class A KDKA Pittsburgh, WLVJ must reduce power at night to 1,500 watts, when AM radio waves travel further.  The station uses a directional antenna at all times.  The transmitter is off U.S. Route 441 (State Route 7) in Delray Beach, Florida.

History
The station went on the air as WAOP on November 3, 1995. On December 1, 1995, the station changed its call sign to WRBF, on February 1, 2001, to WRHB, on November 5, 2008, to WURN, and on December 6, 2016, to the current WLVJ.

In 2017, Actualidad Radio flipped the frequencies of WLVJ and WURN.  WLVJ moved to AM 1020 and WURN moved to AM 1040.

References

External links

LVJ (AM)
Radio stations established in 2001
2001 establishments in Florida